The women's doubles of the 2019 Advantage Cars Prague Open tournament was played on clay in Prague, Czech Republic.

Cornelia Lister and Nina Stojanović were the defending champions, but both players chose not to participate.

Nicoleta Dascălu and Raluca Șerban won the title, defeating Lucie Hradecká and Johana Marková in the final, 6–4, 6–4.

Seeds

Draw

Draw

References

External Links
Main Draw

Advantage Cars Prague Open - Doubles
Advantage Cars Prague Open